This is a list of Brazilian schools in Japan. The Brazilian schools on Japanese soil, aimed at the hundreds of thousands of Brazilians in Japan, number more than 80.

Gifu Prefecture
Ōgaki
Hirogakuen
Kakamigahara
Educacional Nova Etapa
Minokamo
Isaki Nyuton College
Kani
Sociedade Educacional Brazilian School (Gifu)

Shizuoka Prefecture
Kikugawa
Centro de Ensino Nippo-Brasileiro (Colégio Nippo-Objetivo de Kikugawa)

Hamamatsu
Escola Alcance
Escola Alegria de Saber Hamamatsu
Escola Brasileira de Hamamatsu
Escola Cantinho Feliz
Mundo de Alegria

Fuji
Escola Fuji

Aichi Prefecture
Toyohashi
Continho Brasileiro (Toyohashi)
Escola Alegria de Saber Toyohashi
Toyota, Aichi
Escola Alegria de Saber Toyota
Hekinan
Escola Alegria de Saber Hekinan

Mie Prefecture
Yokkaichi
Escola Nikken (Yokkaichi)
Suzuka
Escola Alegria de Saber Suzuka

Gunma Prefecture
Ōta, Gunma
Colégio Pitágoras Ota
Escola Paralelo
Ōizumi
Nitihakugakuen

See also
Brazilian schools in Japan
Brazilians in Japan
Japanese Brazilian
Fushūgaku (not attending school)

References

Japan
Brazilian diaspora in Japan
Japanese-Brazilian culture
Brazil–Japan relations
Brazilian schools
Brazilian schools

ja:ブラジル学校#ブラジリアンスクール一覧